Hocking College is a public community college in Nelsonville, Ohio. The college offers more than 60 associate and vocational programs and is accredited by the Higher Learning Commission. The college was chartered in 1969 by the Ohio Board of Regents.

Hocking has 3,474 students enrolled (78% of students are full-time). Its 2,300-acre campus is set in a rural setting and uses a semester-based academic calendar. Hocking's athletic teams are the Hawks. The college is a member of the National Junior College Athletics Association.

History 
Hocking College came into existence as the Tri-County Institute. In the 1960s, the need for a vocational school became apparent in Southeast Ohio through demographic studies and population surveys. The Tri-County Institute was built on the campus of the Tri-County Joint Vocational School with the schools sharing laboratory and service areas. Fall 1968 marked the opening of the Institute with approximately 250 students and 28 instructors. In 1969, the Ohio Board of Regents granted a charter to the institute, and they were authorized to grant degrees in 13 technical programs. The first commencement took place in June 1970 with 117 graduates.

In 1972, the official name of the school was changed to Hocking Technical College and 250 acres were purchased for new building and future development. In 1975, the college relocated its main campus to its current site on Hocking Parkway. The same year, residence halls opened on Hocking's campus, making it the only two-year school in Ohio to have college-owned residence halls available to its students. Hocking College was first accredited by the North Central Association of Colleges and Schools, Higher Learning Commission (HLC) in 1976. During the 1980s, Hocking College continued to grow and expand, establishing many sister-colleges worldwide, in places such as Taiwan, Japan and Jamaica. In 1990, the Perry Campus in New Lexington opened to serve the needs of Perry County residents. In 1991, the college's name officially changed for a second time to Hocking College. In 1997, the college purchased Lake Snowden in Albany, Ohio and in 1998 renamed it as the Lake Snowden Education and Recreation Park.

In addition to their main campus, Hocking College owns and operates Lake Snowden, a  recreation area in Lee Township.  They also own  of open-space land in the rugged landscape of York Township, west of the campus.

Academics
The college offers programs within the areas of Allied Health; Arts, Business and Science; Engineering and Information Technology; Hospitality; Natural Resources; Nursing; and Public Safety Services.

Research
Hocking College became one of two licensed cannabis testing laboratories for Ohio in 2018. In early 2018, the Ohio Department of Commerce licensed Hocking College to test Ohio's medical marijuana before it is passed through the state-regulated supply chain. Jonathan Cachat, Director of Laboratory Sciences, lead the development of these cannabis focused initiatives. The college's medical and chemical laboratory, confirmed by the Ohio Department of Higher Education, tests available supplies for common cannabinoids (delta-9-THC, cannabidiol, and cannabinol), purity, potency, and chemical content. In July 2018, The Ohio Department of Higher Education confirmed the college's associates programs in Applied Science and Laboratory Science. The laboratory is located in the historic downtown area of Nelsonville. The lab will also be used in courses related to a new major in the associate degree in Laboratory Sciences program, Cannabis Laboratory, beginning in early 2019.

Controversies

2008 financial scandal
In August 2008, the Ohio Auditor's office announced an audit of Hocking College to investigate possible financial irregularities. President John Light and his wife, senior vice president Roxanne DuVivier, were found to have taken money illegally from the college. They pled no contest to the charges, were fined, and ordered to pay restitution.

Light was replaced by Ron Erickson, who was fired within a month for sending a campus-wide e-mail complaining about micromanagement by the board of trustees. Erickson was reinstated three months later.

Racist threat
In January 2010, a note threatening that black students would be killed on a specific date the following month was found in a dormitory bathroom. The school increased security measures and offered a financial reward for information leading to arrest. Two black students who feared for their safety withdrew from the college. This prompted the college to review and revise campus security policies. The college installed security cameras throughout each dormitory and hired additional residence hall staff.

Killing of Michael Whitmer
On July 27, 2021, Hocking College Police Officer Cecil Morrison shot and killed 37-year-old Michael Whitmer while responding to a domestic dispute call as Whitmer attempted to drive away. A Nelsonville officer was hit by ricocheted bullets. Morrison, who was hired by Nelsonville Police after the shooting, later pleaded no contest to a negligent homicide charge. He surrendered his law enforcement powers.

References

External links
Official website

Education in Athens County, Ohio
1968 establishments in Ohio
Educational institutions established in 1968
Protected areas of Athens County, Ohio
Protected areas of Ohio
Buildings and structures in Athens County, Ohio
Tourist attractions in Athens County, Ohio
Community colleges in Ohio